Abdul Latīf Pedrām (born 29 July 1963) is a politician and a Member of Parliament in Afghanistan. He emerged as a controversial figure in the press and political circles for campaigning for women's personal rights, a taboo subject in Afghanistan's culture. Currently, he is the leader of the National Congress Party of Afghanistan and was one of the nine representatives of Badakhshan province in the lower house of parliament. He is on the run since August 2021 following Taliban’s takeover of Kabul. His home town fell prior to Kabul.

Biography 

Born in Maimay, Badakhshan on the 29th of July, 1963 to a Persian-speaking Tājīk family, Latīf Pedrām is a writer, poet, journalist, and professor of Persian literature. He was director of the library of the Hakīm Nāṣer Ḫoṣrow Balḫī Cultural Center. First a supporter of the communist government, he soon began to openly criticize and oppose the Soviet occupation of Afghanistan and turned toward Ahmad Shah Masood. He stayed in Afghanistan during most of the war years, moving around the country to be able to pursue his activities. Latīf Pedrām was finally forced into exile by the advance of the Taliban. Before returning to Afghanistan after the demise of the Taliban, he lived for a while in France where he studied political sciences and attempted to promote Afghanistan's Persian poetry and literature.

Political views

Latīf Pedrām is a strong supporter of secularism, federalism and decentralization in Afghanistan. He denounces corruption and strongly opposes Islamic fundamentalism. He advocates an independent, but decentralized Afghanistan, and believes that the country should be divided into autonomous regions under the control of regional capitals.

Although his party is multi-ethnic and is, so far, the only opposition party that is not linked to an armed group, he is regarded by some as a secular Tajik nationalist politician. Perhaps his most controversial statement is the demand for a name-change in Afghanistan. In many publications and articles, he proposed the change of the name "Afghanistan" to "Khorasan", the medieval name of the region, in order to settle some inter-ethnic feuds. His statement is based on the fact that the current name of the country is synonymous with "Land of Pashtuns".

Presidential elections 2004 

Pedram received the 5th most votes during the 2004 elections, with approximately 1.4% of the total ballots counted, and approximately 17% of the ballots in his home province Badakhshan - being the strongest of the small candidates. Following the outcome, he criticized the government and the results, saying that "large-scale fraud had occurred", which was "completely shameful." Prior to the votes, Pedram had argued that the presidential election should be delayed because of insecurity and to arrange for the whole Afghan diaspora to vote.

2008 controversy 

In February 2008, an alleged audio recording of Pedram was aired by various TV channels in Afghanistan, claiming that Pedram had "disrespected" and "insulted" former King of Afghanistan, Amanullah Khan, who is regarded as a "national hero" by many in the country. However, In an interview on Khorasan TV he denied this claim and said that his voice was tampered with. This led to hot editorial crossfires among the press and in the Parliament and Cabinet, echoing with ethnic conflicts when ethnic blocks were identified supporting and criticizing Pedram. Following this, the government of Afghanistan tried banning the National Congress Party of Afghanistan and ordered that "comments about former kings, the president and Jihadi leaders are not allowed." Since the incident, Pedram lived under house arrest in Kabul until November 2008. While expressing its concern regarding the regression of democracy in Afghanistan one year before the 2009 presidential elections, the International Federation for Human Rights (FIDH) called for the unconditional release of Latīf Pedrām.

2009 Presidential election

In January 2009 an article by Aḥmad Madjidyar of the American Enterprise Institute included Pedrām on a list of fifteen possible candidates in the controversial 2009 Afghan Presidential election.
Preliminary results placed Pedrām eleventh in a field of 38 candidates and according to the controversial Independent Election Committee (IEC), he ultimately received 0.34% of the votes. According to IEC results, Pedrām received 6,686 votes in his home province of Badakhshan, considerably lower than the 33,510 votes he received during the 2004 presidential election.

2010 Parliamentary election 

In the 2010 Afghan parliamentary election, Pedram received 8,469 votes in Badakhshan, being the third representative from that province to be elected into the parliament, after Fawzia Koofi and Zalmai Mojadidi.

Political Vision 

Latif Pedram is the founder and leader of Afghanistan National Congress Party and the founder of the Tajik's Council of Afghanistan. Tajiks constituted the main anti-Taliban fighting force in the past known as Northern Alliance or United Islamic Front for Salvation of Afghanistan. Latif Pedram's political vision is to empower the human rights of minorities like Pashaiyis, Parachis, Hazaras and other ethnicities and to promote equality, brotherhood among the different ethnicities and possibly even a name change of the country from Afghanistan to a non-tribal name.

Awards

Pedram has received several international awards, including:

The Prix Hellman-Helmet (Hellman-Helmet Prize) by Human Rights Watch in July 1999
A special grant from Reporters sans Frontières in December 1998
He is also an honorary member of:

The International Parliament of Writers and a guest of the city of Suresnes in France
The "Association of the Persian speakers of the World" ("Peyvand") and member of the board of editors of Peyvand journal

Quotes

References

External links

Democracy in Danger: Latif Pedram placed under house arrest
PBS Frontline: World: Afghanistan Without Warlords, a Secular Politician
LibertyRadio.org Biography
An interview with l'Humanité (in English, January 1, 2007)
Institute for War and Peace Reporting: Abdul Latif Pedram: Intellectual Adds Controversy to Campaign
National Congress Party of Afghanistan Website
Tajikam Portal

Persian-language poets
21st-century Persian-language writers
1963 births
Living people
People from Badakhshan Province
National Congress Party of Afghanistan politicians
Tajik poets
Afghan Tajik people
Afghan secularists
Afghan democracy activists